The 2012 Deir ez-Zor bombing involved a car bomb blast in the Syrian city of Deir ez-Zor killing 9 people on 19 May 2012 during the Syrian Civil War. The blast struck a parking lot for a military intelligence complex.

See also
 List of bombings during the Syrian Civil War

References

Deir ez-Zor
Car and truck bombings in Syria
Terrorist incidents in Syria in 2012
May 2012 events in Syria
Deir ez-Zor Governorate in the Syrian civil war